Werner Bernreuther (born 6 December 1941 in Sonneberg, Thuringia) is a German actor, singer-songwriter, writer, poet, translator and painter.

Biography 
Bernreuther trained as an electrician, studied 1965–1969 at the Academy of Dramatic Art in Leipzig and was then committed to the stages Freiberg and Gera. Bernreuther received Chanson lessons from Heinrich Pohle and Fania Fénelon. At the 4th Chanson days of the GDR, he was awarded the prize of the Writers' Union of the German Democratic Republic. Bernreuther sings partly in his native Itzgründisch dialect and mixed "folk song-like structure with intellectual thinking." In the 1980s, he made radio and television productions, inter alia in Rund, Liedercircus '86, Pfundgrube und Liederkarussell. Bernreuther was abroad, inter alia in Romania on tour. He studied 1979–1982 at the Literature Institute in Leipzig and had since 1981 held a lectureship for Chanson at the University of Music and Theatre Leipzig and is part of the Leipziger songs scene. His adaptations of songs Bulat Okudzhavas appeared 1985. Bernreuther spent 15 years artistic director of the Chanson days Kloster Michaelstein and from 1984 in charge as deputy chairman of the "Section Chanson and Songwriter of the General Committee for entertainment art of the GDR" for training. In this capacity, he installed in 1986 a two-year course for Singer-Songwriter, consisting of 14-day intensive courses, the so-called "Songwriter-University of the GDR". Among the participants were Maike Nowak, Frank Viehweg, the songs company Dietze and Norbert Bischof. Bernreuther was also called a "guru of the East German singer-songwriters", because he like no other strove for the next generation of critical voices. His pupils include Hubertus Schmidt, Stephan Krawczyk, the group Liedehrlich, Dieter Kalka, Joachim Schäfer, Maike Nowak, Andrea Thelemann and Norbert Bischof. 
Today Bernreuther lives in Berlin.

Works

Stage programs 
 "Mit offenen Augen" – (Solo program on Tour) 1981
 "Lieder – Balladen – Geschichten" – (Solo program on Tour) 1983
 "Landläufige Gesänge" – (Solo program on Tour) 1985
 "Sehnsucht nach Heimweh"- (Solo program on Tour) 1988 /1989
 "Der Winter ist vergangen" (Together with the group "Liedehrlich")
 "Liederzirkus '86" – (together with "Circus Lila", Gerhard Schöne and others)

Translations of poetry 
 Tschechische Chansons in: "Jungfer Lotty" Eulenspiegel-Verlag
 Songs of Bulat Okudschawa
 Songs of Zora Jandová from Czech for German TV
 Songs of Ivan Darvas from Hungarian for German TV

Vinyl and CD 
 Sehnsucht nach Heimweh, 1989/99
 Mit offenen Augen, 1982
 Jungfer Lotty

Books 
 Negerküsse in Zigeunersoße, Essay by Dieter Kalka with 12 drawings by Werner Bernreuther, Edition Beulenspiegel, AndreBuchVerlag, 2021 ISBN 9-783949-143045

Children's books 
 Reimkramkiste, 1993
 Kotsch-Lasch-Kautschen-Pfff, 1994
 Piraten in der Badewanne, 1996

Plays 
 Riesenspiel, 1995
 Und noch steht das Haus, 1996
 Leichenschmaus auf Probe, UA 1997 im Leipziger "Theater Fact"
 Der doppelte Hans, 1997

References

External links 
 Website of Werner Bernreuther
 Werner Bernreuther on the Website of “Leipziger Liederszene”
 Former students about Werner Bernreuther
 Participants in the special course/University of Singer-Songwriter about Werner Bernreuther
 Materials for music history: Werner Bernreuther about the Chanson days in Kloster Michaelstein

1941 births
Living people
People from Sonneberg
German male poets
East German writers
Writers from Thuringia
German male singer-songwriters
German male film actors
20th-century German painters
20th-century German male singers
21st-century German male singers
German male painters
20th-century German male writers
21st-century German male writers
Academic staff of the University of Music and Theatre Leipzig
20th-century German male artists
21st-century German male artists